British Lions were a short-lived British rock band, together from 1977 to 1979, with former members of Mott and Medicine Head. They toured Britain extensively, as support to Status Quo, whose management they shared, and AC/DC, but were more successful in America. They released two studio albums with little commercial success in the UK. Their second album was rejected by RSO and then by Vertigo, and they disbanded in 1979. The release rights were acquired by Cherry Red, who released it the following year.

Members
Morgan Fisher – piano, Hammond organ, Korg synthesizer, davolisint
John Fiddler – guitar, harmonica, vocals
Dale Griffin – drums
Ray Majors – guitar, vocals
Pete Overend Watts – bass, vocals

Discography

Studio albums

Singles
"One More Chance to Run" (1977)		
"Wild in the Streets" (1978) US Hot 100, #87		
"International Heroes"/"Eat the Rich" (1978)

Compilations and live albums 
 Live And Rare (1999) 
 Live at the Old Waldorf: San Francisco 1978 (2010)

References

External links
British Lions at Discogs

English hard rock musical groups
English glam rock groups
Vertigo Records artists
RSO Records artists